Walter Soares Belitardo Júnior (born 11 December 1990), commonly known as Juninho, is a Brazilian professional footballer who currently plays as an attacking midfielder for Hong Kong Premier League club Rangers (HKG).

Club career

Sporting de Macau
After terminating his contract with Barretos in 2015 due to low pay and delays in payment, Juninho decided to move to Macau in search of a higher salary. He moved to Macau with the intention of signing a professional contract but due to a misunderstanding as to the professional opportunities in Macau, he was ultimately forced to play as an amateur for Sporting de Macau in order to continue his career.

Tung Sing
Juninho signed with Hong Kong Premier League club Dreams, then known as Biu Chun Glory Sky, in the summer of 2016. However, as the club later signed additional foreign players, BCGS did not have room on their squad to register him.

Juninho then moved to Tung Sing in September 2016. In his only season with the club, he scored 31 goals in 22 appearances, finishing third in the Golden Boot race.

Yuen Long
Following the 2016-17 season, Juninho went on trial with HKPL club Rangers but was not signed. A week before the 2017-18 season started, Juninho was signed to Yuen Long.

Pegasus
On 23 July 2018, it was announced at Pegasus' season opening event that the club had signed Juninho for the 2018–19 campaign.

Yuen Long
On 8 August 2019, Juninho was loaned to Yuen Long after Pegasus had signed a new foreign player. He rejoined the club after one year.

Rangers
On 17 October 2020, it was announced that Juninho was signed for Rangers.

Honours
Yuen Long
Hong Kong Senior Shield: 2017–18

References

External links
Walter Soares Belitardo Júnior at HKFA

Living people
1990 births
Clube Atlético Votuporanguense players
Hong Kong First Division League players
Hong Kong Premier League players
Yuen Long FC players
TSW Pegasus FC players
Hong Kong Rangers FC players
Expatriate footballers in Hong Kong
Brazilian expatriate sportspeople in Hong Kong
Association football midfielders
Brazilian footballers
Hong Kong League XI representative players